The peyote (Lophophora williamsii ) is a small, spineless cactus which contains psychoactive alkaloids, particularly mescaline. Peyote is a Spanish word derived from the Nahuatl , meaning "caterpillar cocoon", from a root , "to glisten". Peyote is native to Mexico and southwestern Texas. It is found primarily in the Sierra Madre Occidental, the Chihuahuan Desert and in the states of Nayarit, Coahuila, Nuevo León, Tamaulipas, and San Luis Potosí among scrub. It flowers from March to May, and sometimes as late as September. The flowers are pink, with thigmotactic anthers (like Opuntia).

Known for its psychoactive properties when ingested, peyote has at least 5,500 years of entheogenic and medicinal use by indigenous North Americans.

Description

The various species of the genus Lophophora grow low to the ground and they often form groups with numerous, crowded shoots. The blue-green, yellow-green or sometimes reddish-green shoots are mostly flattened spheres with sunken shoot tips. There are often significant, vertical ribs consisting of low and rounded or hump-like bumps. From the cusp areoles arises a tuft of soft, yellowish or whitish woolly hairs. Spines are absent. Flowers are pink or white to slightly yellowish, sometimes reddish.

The cactus produces flowers sporadically; these are followed by small edible pink fruit. The club-shaped to elongated, fleshy fruits are bare and more or less rosy colored. At maturity, they are brownish-white and dry. They contain black, pear-shaped seeds that are 1 to 1.5 mm long and 1 mm wide. The seeds require hot and humid conditions to germinate. Peyote contains a large spectrum of phenethylamine alkaloids. The principal one is mescaline for which the content of Lophophora williamsii is about 0.4% fresh (undried) and 3–6% dried.

Taxonomy
French botanist Charles Antoine Lemaire described the species as Echinocactus williamsii in 1845. It was placed in the new genus Lophophora in 1894 by  American botanist John Merle Coulter.

Distribution and habitat

L. williamsii is native to southern North America, mainly distributed in Mexico. In the United States, it grows in Southern Texas. In Mexico, it grows in the states of Chihuahua, Coahuila, Nuevo León, and Tamaulipas in the north to San Luis Potosi and Zacatecas. Its habitat is primarily in desert scrub, particularly thorn scrub in Tamaulipas. It is common on or near limestone hills.

Cultivation
Peyote is extremely slow growing. Cultivated specimens grow considerably faster, sometimes taking less than three years to go from seedling to mature flowering adult. More rapid growth can be achieved by grafting peyote onto mature San Pedro root stock. The top of the above-ground part of the cactus, the crown, consists of disc-shaped buttons. These are cut above the roots and sometimes dried. When done properly, the top of the root forms a callus and the root does not rot. When poor harvesting techniques are used, however, the entire plant dies. Currently in South Texas, peyote grows naturally but has been over-harvested, to the point that the state has listed it as an endangered species. Cultivation is an important conservation tool for this particular species.

Uses

Psychoactivity and folk medicine

When used for its psychoactive properties, common doses for pure mescaline range from roughly 200 to 400 mg. This translates to a dose of roughly 10 to 20 g of dried peyote buttons of average potency; however, potency varies considerably between samples, making it difficult to measure doses accurately without first extracting the mescaline. The effects last about 10 to 12 hours. Peyote is reported to trigger rich visual or auditory effects (see synesthesia) and spiritual or philosophical insights.

In addition to psychoactive use, some Native American tribes use the plant in folk medicine. They employ peyote for varied ailments. Although uncommon, use of peyote and mescaline has been associated with poisoning. Peyote contains the alkaloid, hordenine (also called peyocactin).

History
In 2005, researchers used radiocarbon dating and alkaloid analysis to study two specimens of peyote buttons found in archaeological digs from a site called Shumla Cave No. 5 on the Rio Grande in Texas. The results dated the specimens to between 3780 and 3660 BCE. Alkaloid extraction yielded approximately 2% of the alkaloids including mescaline in both samples. This indicates that native North Americans were likely to have used peyote since at least five-and-a-half thousand years ago.

Specimens from a burial cave in west central Coahuila, Mexico have been similarly analyzed and dated to 810 to 1070 CE.

From earliest recorded time, peyote has been used by indigenous peoples, such as the Huichol of northern Mexico and by various Native American tribes, native to or relocated to the Southern Plains states of present-day Oklahoma and Texas. Its usage was also recorded among various Southwestern Athabaskan-language tribal groups. The Tonkawa, the Mescalero, and Lipan Apache were the source or first practitioners of peyote religion in the regions north of present-day Mexico. They were also the principal group to introduce peyote to newly arrived migrants, such as the Comanche and Kiowa from the Northern Plains. The religious, ceremonial, and healing uses of peyote may date back over 2,000 years.

Under the auspices of what came to be known as the Native American Church, in the 19th century, American Indians in more widespread regions to the north began to use peyote in religious practices, as part of a revival of native spirituality. Its members refer to peyote as "the sacred medicine", and use it to combat spiritual, physical, and other social ills. Concerned about the drug's psychoactive effects, between the 1880s and 1930s, U.S. authorities attempted to ban Native American religious rituals involving peyote, including the Ghost Dance. Today the Native American Church is one among several religious organizations to use peyote as part of its religious practice. Some users claim the drug connects them to God.

Traditional Navajo belief or ceremonial practice did not mention the use of peyote before its introduction by the neighboring Utes. The Navajo Nation now has the most members of the Native American Church.

John Raleigh Briggs (1851–1907) was the first to draw scientific attention of the Western scientific world to peyote. Louis Lewin described Anhalonium lewinii in 1888. British sexologist Havelock Ellis self experimented with it on Good Friday 1896, publishing details in 1898. Arthur Heffter conducted self experiments on its effects in 1897. Similarly, Norwegian ethnographer Carl Sofus Lumholtz studied and wrote about the use of peyote among the Indians of Mexico. Lumholtz also reported that, lacking other intoxicants, Texas Rangers captured by Union forces during the American Civil War soaked peyote buttons in water and became "intoxicated with the liquid".

Adverse reactions
A study published in 2007 found no evidence of long-term cognitive problems related to peyote use in Native American Church ceremonies, but researchers stressed their results may not apply to those who use peyote in other contexts. A four-year large-scale study of Navajo who regularly ingested peyote found only one case where peyote was associated with a psychotic break in an otherwise healthy person; other psychotic episodes were attributed to peyote use in conjunction with pre-existing substance abuse or mental health problems. Later research found that those with pre-existing mental health issues are more likely to have adverse reactions to peyote. Peyote use does not appear to be associated with hallucinogen persisting perception disorder (a.k.a. "flashbacks") after religious use. Peyote also does not seem to be associated with physical dependence, but some users may experience psychological dependence.

Peyote can have strong emetic effects, and one death has been attributed to esophageal bleeding caused by vomiting after peyote ingestion in a Native American patient with a history of alcohol abuse. Peyote is also known to cause potentially serious variations in heart rate, blood pressure, breathing, and pupillary dilation.

Research into the huichol natives of central-western Mexico, who have taken peyote regularly for an estimated 1,500 years or more, found no evidence of chromosome damage in either men or women.

Cultural significance

Wixarika (Huichol) culture
The Wixarika religion consists of four principal deities: Corn, Kayumarie (Blue Deer), Hikuri (Peyote), and the Eagle, all descended from their Sun God. Schaefer has interpreted this to mean that peyote is the soul of their religious culture and a visionary sacrament that opens a pathway to the other deities.

Legality

United Nations

Canada
Mescaline is listed as a Schedule III controlled substance under the Canadian Controlled Drugs and Substances Act, but peyote is specifically exempt. Possession and use of peyote plants is legal.

United States
Non-drug uses of peyote in religious ceremonies by the Native American Church and its members is exempt from registration. This law has been codified as a statute in the American Indian Religious Freedom Act of 1978, and made part of the common law in Peyote Way Church of God, Inc. v.
Section 1307.31 Native American Church. The listing of peyote as a controlled substance in Schedule I does not apply to the nondrug use of peyote in bona fide religious ceremonies of the Native American Church, and members of the Native American Church so using peyote are exempt from registration. Any person who manufactures peyote for or distributes peyote to the Native American Church, however, is required to obtain registration annually and to comply with all other requirements of law.

U.S. v. Boyll, 774 F.Supp. 1333 (D.N.M. 1991) addresses this racial issue specifically and concludes:

For the reasons set out in this Memorandum Opinion and
Order, the Court holds that, pursuant to 21 C.F.R. § 1307.31
(1990), the classification of peyote as a Schedule I controlled
substance, see 21 U.S.C. § 812(c), Schedule I(c)(12), does not
apply to the importation, possession or use of peyote for 'bona
fide' ceremonial use by members of the Native American Church,
regardless of race.

US v. Boyll expanded permitted use to all persons engaged in traditional Indian religious use, regardless of race. All US states with the exception of Idaho, Utah, and Texas allow usage by non-native, non-enrolled persons in the context of ceremonies of the Native American Church. Some states such as Arizona additionally exempt any general bona fide religious activity or spiritual intent. US jurisdictions enacted these specific statutory exemptions in reaction to the US Supreme Court's decision in Employment Division v. Smith, which held that laws prohibiting the use of peyote that do not specifically exempt religious use nevertheless do not violate the Free Exercise Clause of the First Amendment. Though use in Native American Church ceremonies or traditional Indian religious use, regardless of race, is legal under US federal law and additional uses are legal under some state laws, peyote is listed by the United States DEA as a Schedule I controlled substance.

The US military prohibits inductees from enlistment for prior drug usage, however past usage of peyote is permissible if found to be used in accordance with Native American cultural practices.

See also
 Ayahuasca
 Carlos Castaneda – an author of books involving his experiences with peyote.
 Convention on Psychotropic Substances: Psychedelic plants and fungi
 N,N-Dimethyltryptamine
 Psychedelic experience
 Peyote song
 Reuben Snake
 R. Gordon Wasson

References

Further reading
 Calabrese, Joseph D. "The Therapeutic Use of Peyote in the Native American Church" Chapter 3 in Vol. 1 of Psychedelic Medicine: New Evidence for Hallucinogens as Treatments, Michael J. Winkelman and Thomas B. Roberts (editors) (2007). Westport, CT: Praeger/Greenwood.
 Dawson, Alexander S. 2018. The Peyote Effect: From the Inquisition to the War on Drugs. University of California Press, 2018.
 Jay, Mike. 2019. Mescaline: A Global History of the First Psychedelic. Yale University Press
Feeney, Kevin. "The Legal Basis for Religious Peyote Use." Chapter 13 in Vol 1 of Psychedelic Medicine: New Evidence for Hallucinogens as Treatments, Michael J. Winkelman and Thomas B. Roberts (editors) (2007). Westport, CT: Praeger/Greenwood.
 Baggot, Matthew J. A Note on the Safety of Peyote when Used Religiously. Council on Spiritual Practices, 1996.
 Labate, Beatriz; Cavnar, Clancy: Peyote: History, Tradition, Politics, and Conservation. Praeger, 2016. 
 Rätsch, Christian, The Encyclopedia of Psychoactive Plants, Enthnopharmacology and Its Applications 1998/2005, Rochester, Vermont, Park Street Press, 
 Pollan, Michael 2021 This Is Your Mind on Plants © 2021 Penguin Books

External links

 USDA: NRCS Plants Profile Lophophora williamsii

Lophophora
Entheogens
Herbal and fungal hallucinogens
Flora of the Chihuahuan Desert
Flora of Texas
Flora of New Mexico
Flora of Northeastern Mexico
Flora of the Rio Grande valleys
Flora of Zacatecas
Native American Church
Native American religion
Huichol
Plants used in traditional Native American medicine
Psychedelic phenethylamine carriers
Religion and politics
Cacti of the United States
Cacti of Mexico
Psychoactive cacti